Parliamentary elections were held in the Kingdom of Dalmatia in 1883. The elections marked the first time that a party other than People's Party or Autonomist Party won seats in the Diet of Dalmatia.

Results

References

Bibliography

Elections in Croatia
Dalmatia
1883 in Croatia
Elections in Austria-Hungary
History of Dalmatia
Election and referendum articles with incomplete results